Clubiona aducta is a sac spider species found in Portugal and Spain.

See also 
 List of Clubionidae species

References

External links 

Clubionidae
Spiders of Europe
Spiders described in 1932